Brit Awards 1983 was the third event of the Brit Awards, an annual pop music award ceremony in the United Kingdom. It was run by the British Phonographic Industry and took place on 8 February 1983 at Grosvenor House Hotel in London. The host was  Tim Rice.

Winners and nominees

Multiple nominations and awards
The following artists received multiple awards and/or nominations. don't count the Sony Trophy Award for Technical Excellence.

References

External links
Brit Awards 1983 at Brits.co.uk

Brit Awards
Brit Awards
BRIT Awards
BRIT Awards
Brit Awards
Brit Awards